Nekraje  is a village in Kasaragod district in the state of Kerala, India.

Demographics
As of 2011 Census, Nekraje village had a population of 12,519 which constitutes 6,110 males and 6,409 females. The male female sex ratio was 1049 lower than state average of 1084. Population in the age group 0-6 was 1,665 (13.3%) where 889 are males and 776 are females. Nekraje had an average literacy of 85.9% higher than the national average of 74% and lower than state average of 94%: male literacy was 90.9% and female literacy was 81.2%.

References

Suburbs of Kasaragod